The Kleine Kalmit ("Little Kalmit"; from Lat. calvus mons = bare hill) is a hill,  high, just outside the eastern edge of the  Palatine Forest, and the Haardt range, in the German state of Rhineland-Palatinate. Parts of the hill have been designated as a Nature reserve bearing the same name.

Geography 
The Kleine Kalmit lies about 15 km south of its namesake, the 672.6 m high Kalmit, and about 6 km southwest of Landau outside the Haardt itself. Most of the hill, including its symbol, the little chapel on the summit dome which is visible for many miles, lies on the territory of the parish of Arzheim in the borough of Landau. Its south and southwest sides, with their vineyards, belong to the municipality of Ilbesheim. This latter area includes the only place in the Palatinate where saffron is grown.

Flora and fauna 

The Kleine Kalmit is a botanical jewel with a rich community of the rare pasque flower and is designated as a Nature reserve. Its species-rich fauna includes 87 types of spider and 43 species of butterfly.

In addition, fossils of shark's teeth and artefacts from the Stone Age have been found here.

References

Literature

External links 

 Legal ordinance about the Kleine Kalmit Nature Reserve, county of Südliche Weinstraße and town of Landau/Pfalz dated 28 June 1984 (PDF, 143 kB)
 General information (Osiris)
 Map of the nature reserve

Mountains and hills of the Palatinate Forest
Nature reserves in Rhineland-Palatinate
South Palatinate
Mountains and hills of Rhineland-Palatinate